Centro Universitario Anglo Mexicano (Anglo Mexican University Centre) es una escuela mexicana afiliada a la UNAM (Universidad Nacional Autónoma de Mexico).

History
After structuring and directing Queen Elizabeth's elementary school for several years, its principal, some professors and a group of businessmen, joined efforts to plan and create an integral non-religious private high school affiliated to National Autonomous University of Mexico (UNAM), which would emphasize critical thinking, scientific research and innovation combined with arts development and competitive sports as an ideal environment for young men and women, serving as a solid platform for college and life success.

The Anglo Mexican HS, CUAM HS was inaugurated on September 4, 1974, in the residential San José Insurgentes neighborhood, in Mexico City, starting at that time, with 108 students, most of them Queen Elizabeth's School graduates. With a successful academic and cultural model of their own, after only ten years, expansion came on a new location, CUAM Aguilas which was designed to host larger sports facilities and also serve for the expanding senior class, in the Las Aguilas neighborhood. In 1985, the first regional school was launched in the resort town of Cuernavaca; CUAM Morelos, started with over 120 newcoming students, rapidly consolidating as a magnet for young talents and athletes. In 1989, after a State's government invitation to improve academic standards and increase college oriented competitive students, CUAM Acapulco was inaugurated, serving a population of over 150 students in high school and for the first time, returning to its roots, activating also  Jr. high school level.

According to changing demographics, in 1999, CUAM Águilas was transformed into CEAM Mexico junior high school, as well as the fourth regional CUAM opened, in the city of Cancún, through a strategic alliance with well recognized Centro Escolar BALAM, offering now from kindergarten to high school, K-12. In 2004, CUAM acquired a beautiful property formerly owned by Mexican comedian Mario Moreno "Cantinflas", which became CEAM Morelos Jr. High School, just across the street from CUAM Morelos.

In 2009, CUAM Mexico migrated to a new and beautiful facility next to CEAM Mexico, to Calzada de Las Aguilas 350, leaving behind its traditional location for the last 33 years in the street of Sagredo. Due to the urban violence and criminal high rise, regretfully after leading for more than 21 years as the top school in Acapulco, with the highest official rankings and consistently winning Guerrero's State academic Olympics, CUAM Acapulco closed its operations in 2009.

Presently, CUAM is considered one of the top high schools in Mexico, having earned a highly respected reputation through the years and for its alumni's success in college and professionally, proudly holding more than 40 strategic agreements with the top universities in Mexico, having also added to its allies, Thompson Rivers University, in B.C, Canada, Institutes Nationaux des Sciences Appliquées at Lyon, France and London's Business and Finance University in the UK, which grant direct admission to CUAM graduates, exempting them of any admission examination, as well as awarding them, with more than 20 college excellence financial grants and scholarships.

CUAM México ranked among the Top Ten in Mexico City by the local Reforma newspaper, is headed by the distinguished calculus professor Javier García, a mechanical engineer from UNAM, with graduate studies from ITESM and Harvard University, who has been with CUAM for the last 40 years. Alumni Mariana Velarde, a sociologist with graduate studies in education directs CEAM  Mexico Jr. High School, which has ranked in the top 5% among the 32,000 high schools in the nation, based on the Mexican Ministry of Education statistics. CUAM Morelos, considered as a strong promoter for young science talents, is headed by sociologyst with graduate studies in education, Rosalba Garcia Moreno. CEAM Morelos´ Jr. High principal, is headed by well recognized psychologist Anna Julia Robles, who also holds graduate studies in pedagogy from Ibero American  University. CUAM Mexico's alumni, class of 80, Juan José Arriaga, an UNAM's  canine veterinarian expert, has been heading CUAM Cancun for the 15 years, having led this high school to be the leading academic institution in town, hosting a strategic alliance with International House, the English knowledge, certification international institution for the University of Cambridge, in Cancun. CEAM & CUAM Mérida, are conducted under the experienced psychologist Yolanda Aznar, former CEAM's Morelos Assistant Principal.

CUAM has as priority, to develop global skills for the lives their apprentices are going to live, so it actively promotes and engages in several academic field trips and diverse international exchange programs with schools around the world, which will help their students, to better understand and relate to other cultures, developing friendships and bonds that eventually will become business and investment opportunities, changing their life and vision forever. Current programs include New York in the US, under the Bloomberg's Junior Global Partners initiative, Quebec, British Columbia and,  London in the UK.

CEAM has consistently obtained one of the highest scores on the national Secretaría de Educación Pública (SEP/ENLACE) test for secondary education. CUAM also leads in Mathematics, Sciences and Business. Athletics is CUAM's strength, specially in soccer, volleyball, basketball, as well as cheerleading competitions, having won several national titles and ranked 8th place at the USASF Dance Worlds Championship, in Walt Disney's World in Orlando, Florida in 2010, having had a profound national influence on promoting the sport at all levels, from which, the ANP Mexico, the "Mexican National Cheerleading Association" was born some decades ago.

In partnership with the Morelos´ State Academy of Sciences and the National Academy of Science, for the last 28 years, CUAM has co-hosted an annual "Students´Research Congress" which holds twelve classes of competition that vary from engineering and exact sciences, prototypes, medical sciences, biochemistry, environmental sciences, arts, social sciences and business entrepreneurship, where Jr. high and high school students from about 50 different public and private institutions, coming from more than ten states, present their projects to a panel scientists, research experts and businessmen for the glory of representing Mexico at international events, attending  also during the event to presentations and conferences offered by the real people who are discovering and working on the innovations that are changing our world. This project, has been replicated in Cancún, as the Caribbean's Research Encounter as well as in México City, in the form of Mexico's City Research Encounter.

This event has gathered more than 9,000 projects through its existence, being considered by the Mexican National Autonomous University (UNAM) and scientific community, as the Mexican leading young talents discovery forum. The Students Research Congress is regionally replicated every year in the spring at the Cancun campus, as Caribbean Research Encounter, oriented to soon include schools from Central America.

Annually, CUAM organizes several sports tournaments (called INTERCUAMs) which include social events  and local field trips to provide a whole sports experience with intense participant's integration, on all different campus since the early 90s.  In recognition for its extensive sports tradition, in 2007, the Morelos State government awarded CUAM with the State Sports Award .

CUAM has focused its academic strategies on fostering creativity, innovation, internationalization and critical thinking as base for developing new sustainable opportunities, empowering young talents to research, analyze and propose ethical answers to the Mexico's national challenges, emphasizing the students´ privileged academic position as a moral debt to the least fortunate nationals, which are many, to ethically improve the quality of living in Mexico for all Mexicans, following Winston Churchill's remark closely "To educate a person in mind and not in morals, is to educate a menace to society."

In 2012, Cuam acquired the prestigious Queen Elizabeth School, to integrate Kindergarten and Elementary school, now offering K-12 grade in Mexico City, now being recognized as one of the most respected private educational groups  in the republic.

Due to Mérida's rise as Cultural Capital of the Americas and continuous national migration, on 2016 CEAM Jr. Highschool and CUAM Highschool will start academic activities in that city.

Universities
Some of the universities offering privileged access to CUAM graduates are:

Canadá
Thompson Rivers University, British Columbia

Francia
Intituts Nationaux des Sciences Appliquées, Lyon

Reino Unido
London School of Business and Finance

Morelos
Universidad de Salle
CULTURES Centro Universitario en Lenguas, Turismo y Empresas de Servicios
EUROAMERICA Estudios Superiores en Hotelería y Gastronomía
BOTTICELLI Instituto Fundación Botticelli
ULA Universidad Latinoamericana Campus de la Salud
UNISOL Universidad del Sol
UNINTER Universidad Internacional
UNIC Universidad Cuauhnáhuac

Quintana Roo
ANAHUAC Universidad Anáhuac de Cancún (Cancún)
ISU Instituto Suizo de Gastronomía y Hotelería (Cancún)
ULSA Universidad La Salle de Cancun
MAYAB Universidad del Mayab (Mérida)

Mexico City
ITAM Instituto Tecnológico Autónomo de México
ULSA Universidad La Salle
UIC Universidad Intercontinental
EBC Escuela Bancaria y Comercial
UDLA Universidad de Las Américas
UP *Universidad Panamericana
UC Universidad de la Comunicación
Universidad del Pedregal
UVM Universidad del Valle de México
UNITEC Universidad Tecnológica de México
USB Universidad Simón Bolívar
Universidad Janette Klein
Ambrosía Centro Culinario Ambrosía
CUEP Comunidad Universitaria de Estudios Profesionales
Escuela Bancaria y Comercial
Escuela Mexicana Argentina de Gastronomía
Escuela de Música Fermatta
Centro Universitario Incarnate World
Centro de Estudios Universitarios en Periodismo, Arte y Televisión
Centro de Estudios en Ciencias de la Comunicación

Puebla
Universidad de Las Américas Puebla
Universidad Popular Autónoma del Estado de Puebla
Universidad Iberoamericana
Instituto Suizo de Gastronomía y Hotelería
Escuela Libre de Derecho de Puebla

Recognized graduates

Journalists

Victor Trujillo (known as Brozo)
Irene Moreno
Julieta Rosen
Jorge Salinas

Musicians, singers and composers
Aleks Syntek
Arturo Ramírez (former drummer for Manuel Mijares and Mexican rock group Kerigma)
Mario Carrillo
Álvaro Carrillo (composer)
Federico González (Rey de los Piratas)

Politicians
Luis Garcia, deputy director for the (National Human Rights Commission)
Enrique Iragorri, former federal congressman (PAN)

Soccer players
Fernando Dávila
Francisco Gabriel de Anda
Jaime Lozano

External links
CUAM official page

Educational institutions established in 1974
High schools in Mexico City